Filifusus manuelae is a species of sea snail, a marine gastropod mollusc in the family Fasciolariidae, the spindle snails, the tulip snails and their allies.

Description
The length of the shell attains 101.9 mm.

Distribution
This species occurs in the Indian Ocean off Madagascar.

References

  Bozzetti L. (2008) Pleuroploca manuelae (Gastropoda: Neogastropoda: Fasciolariidae) a new species from Southern Madagascar. Malacologia Mostra Mondiale 58: 8-11.
 Snyder M.A., Vermeij G.J. & Lyons W.G. (2012) The genera and biogeography of Fasciolariinae (Gastropoda, Neogastropoda, Fasciolariidae). Basteria 76(1-3): 31–70.

External links

Fasciolariidae
Gastropods described in 2008